Brookville High School is part of Brookville Local Schools, Brookville, Ohio, United States.  The school's nickname is the Blue Devils.

Brookville High School has been rated "Excellent" since 2002 by the Ohio Department of Education.  The school met all 12 of the state indicators for the 2005–2006 school year.
For the 2007–2008 and –2011-2012 school years, the school was rated "Excellent with Distinction", meeting 29 of the 30 state indicators. The only indicator that was not passed was 8th grade social studies, missing it by 13.3%.

In 2015, The Brookville High School football team went 10–0 in the regular season and 3–1 in the playoffs. They would lose to Coldwater.

On Memorial Day, 2019, Brookville High School was struck by an EF-4 tornado. There were no injuries at the school. The school's roof was torn off, but was deemed salvageable and was repaired.

Ohio High School Athletic Association State Championships

 Boys Baseball – 1935
 Boys Track and Field – 1973

References

External links
 Brookville High School website
 Brookville Local Schools website

High schools in Montgomery County, Ohio
Public high schools in Ohio
High School